Monmouth Township may refer to:

 Monmouth Township, Warren County, Illinois
 Monmouth Township, Jackson County, Iowa
 Monmouth Township, Shawnee County, Kansas

Township name disambiguation pages